Kware is a Local Government Area in Sokoto State, Nigeria. Its headquarters are in the town of Kware on the A1 highway.

It has an area of 554 km and a population of 133,899 at the 2006 census. It is led by a politician called Hon. Usman Mohammed Balkore. Kware has a high number of literate people.

The postal code of the area is 841.

References

Local Government Areas in Sokoto State